Chapin High School is a public high school in Chapin, South Carolina. Nearly 1,400 students attend Chapin High School, as of the 2017–2018 school year. Chapin High School is one of four high schools in Lexington & Richland County School District Five.

Athletics 
Chapin High School competes in the South Carolina High School League in Class AAAAA – Region V. Chapin has competitive teams for cheerleading, football, baseball, basketball, softball, tennis, soccer, volleyball, golf, wrestling, swimming, lacrosse, track, and cross country.

State championships 
 Baseball: 1954, 1956, 1957, 1969, 1982, 1983, 1984, 1996, 2001, 2002, 2018
 Basketball - Boys: 1969, 1970
 Basketball - Girls: 1973
 Competitive Cheer: 1999, 2003, 2005, 2006, 2008, 2009, 2010, 2011, 2012, 2014, 2015, 2016, 2017, 2018, 2019, 2021
 Cross Country - Boys: 1994
 Cross Country - Girls: 1992, 1995, 2002, 2003
 Football: 1973, 1974
 Golf - Boys: 2004
 Lacrosse - Girls: 2019
 Soccer - Boys: 2002, 2003, 2017, 2018
 Soccer - Girls: 2016
 Tennis - Boys: 2010, 2011, 2012
 Tennis - Girls: 1995, 
 Volleyball: 1976, 1999
 Wrestling: 1993, 1996, 1997, 1998

Marching band
The Chapin High School “Pride of the Midlands” Marching Band has won state championships in 1975 (1A), 1985 (2A), 2012 (3A), 2014 (3A), 2015 (3A), and 2017 (3A).

Feeder schools 
The following schools feed into Chapin High School:

Chapin Elementary School
Lake Murray Elementary School
Ballentine Elementary School
Chapin Intermediate School
Chapin Middle School

Notable alumni 

DeWayne Wise – former outfielder for the Chicago White Sox (retired in 2013), Class of 1997
Iron & Wine – singer who had a #2 album on the Billboard 200 in 2011, Class of 1992

References 

Public high schools in South Carolina
Schools in Lexington County, South Carolina
Educational institutions established in 1924
1924 establishments in South Carolina